Vatroslav Lisinski (8 July 1819 – 31 May 1854) was a Croatian composer.

Lisinski was born Ignatius Fuchs to a German Jewish family. He would later change his name to Vatroslav Lisinski, which is a Croatian calque of his original name. For a time he worked as a clerk at the Tabula Banalis in Zagreb.

Lisinski composed the first Croatian opera, Love and Malice (1846), which he wrote at the urging of Alberto Ognjen Štriga, and Porin (1851) as well as numerous works for orchestra, choir and soloists. The Vatroslav Lisinski Concert Hall is named after him.

He was also one of the founders of Illyrism, a movement that advocated the importance of Croatian and more generally South Slavic cultural heritage, as a reaction to Magyarisation during the Austro-Hungarian rule.

Lisinski died in Zagreb on 31 May 1854 and was buried at the Mirogoj Cemetery.

The international train EN 498/499 connecting Zagreb and Munich is named Lisinski.

See also
Lisinski (film)

References

1819 births
1854 deaths
19th-century classical composers
19th-century male musicians
Burials at Mirogoj Cemetery
Croatian opera composers
Croatian classical composers
Croatian people of German-Jewish descent
19th-century German Jews
Jewish opera composers
Male classical composers
Male opera composers
Musicians from Zagreb
People of the Illyrian movement
Romantic composers